Raymond Wong Ho-yin (born 25 August 1975) is a Hong Kong television and film actor.

Early life
Wong completed his secondary education in Hong Kong Tang King Po College and went on to receive a degree from the City University of Hong Kong. He worked as a model after he graduated from his secondary school, and was discovered by director Johnnie To.

Film career
Afterwards, Wong entered the film business and became a full-time film actor. However, most of his early film roles were minor.

ATV period
In 2002, Wong transformed himself into a television actor and joined Asia Television. He participated in number of ATV dramas, such as Son from Past and Central Affairs. Since then, he successfully caught Hong Kong audiences' attention.

TVB period
In 2007, Wong joined Television Broadcasts Limited. He gained his fame in 2009 by portraying Wu Ting-hin in Sweetness in the Salt. He earned nominations in TVB Anniversary Awards in the category for Best Supporting Actor and Most Improved Male Artiste, but lost to Michael Tse and Pierre Ngo respectively. In 2010, he earned his first leading role in When Lanes Merge in portraying a driver who was jailed after being found guilty of dangerous driving. Also, he participated in TVB's anniversary production No Regrets. He portrayed the character Yeung Yeung, who was a childhood friend of Fala Chen's character, Lau Ching, Yeung gives unconditional care love to the ill-fated Ching and later became her husband. He earned three nominations in 2010 TVB Anniversary Awards in the category of Best Supporting Actor, My Favourite Male Character and Most Improved Male Artiste, and he finally won the last one. In 2011, he continue to take part in major leading role in a number of dramas, such as The Truth and Bottled Passion.

In 2021, Wong left the network with his final drama being Forensic Heroes IV and has been signed with Louis Koo's management, Sky High Entertainment since 2019.

Personal life
Wong married Kaka Mok in 2005. The couple have two sons.

In September 2014, Wong was diagnosed with the rare Behçet's disease. In December 2014, he was reported to have recovered, especially with the use of traditional Chinese medicine.

Filmography

Television dramas

Film

References

External links
 
 

|-
! colspan="3" style="background: #DAA520;" | TVB Anniversary Awards
|-

|-
! colspan="3" style="background: #DAA520;" | My AOD Favourites Awards
|-

1975 births
Living people
Alumni of the City University of Hong Kong
Hong Kong male film actors
Hong Kong male television actors
TVB veteran actors
20th-century Hong Kong male actors
21st-century Hong Kong male actors